Naani is an 2004 Indian Telugu-language science-fiction romantic comedy film released in 2004. It was directed by S. J. Surya and stars Mahesh Babu, Ameesha Patel. The film is bilingual, simultaneously shot in Tamil as New with a slightly different cast and features music composed by A. R. Rahman. Made on a budget of ₹12 crore, the film released on 14 May 2004. It was a flop at the box-office.

Plot
Naani is a mischievous eight-year-old boy who is always troubling his mother. His mother scolds him for his behavior, such as when he eats toothpaste or urinates in bed. Naani falls down on a road one day and a young woman helps him. Naani's elder brother plans to watch a movie with his friends in the absence of their parents and Naani demands to join him, which his brother does not allow. Angered, Naani cuts off the power which creates a short circuit at home. Naani's mother scolds him and shouts at her husband for not stopping with one child. This hurts Naani and he runs away from home to jump into a river. But he is stopped by an old man who takes Naani to his place. The old man introduces himself as a scientist who has his own laboratory. He insists that Naani help him in his research. Naani agrees and the scientist uses his research to transform him into a young man. Naani starts to live as a young man physically, but remains a child mentally. He stays away from his family. The only person other than the scientist who knows the truth is his child friend. Naani meets a girl (Priya) at a park who helped him once when he fell down. Naani helps remove dust from her eyes, smiles at her, and leaves. The girl is attracted to him and looks for him.

Naani goes for a job interview at a toy manufacturing company. The owner who interviews him demands that he have childhood memories and be like a child to understand children's tastes. Naani grabs the job easily. The company falls into the hands of the owner's daughter who turns out to be Priya. Priya is happy to see Naani in her company. Their friendship makes Raj (another employee) jealous. Naani overcomes Raj's idea for a new type of bed for kids and introduces his own idea. Naani meets his brother as an anonymous man and hears that his mother is depressed over Naani's disappearance. Naani meets his mother who had fallen ill. Naani asks the scientist to change him back. The scientist complies and Naani reconciles with his mother. That night he changes back into the young man, shocking the scientist.

Naani lives as an eight-year-old boy during the day and as a twenty eight-year man (Vichu) at night. Priya expresses her love, but Vichu tells her to love a man suitable for her age. The scientist tells Vichu to accept Priya. Priya asks him to accompany her to a matinee. Young boy Naani cannot appear. He sees Priya angrily waiting for Vichu at the theatre while going home with his mother. Naani's mother befriends Priya and Priya comes to like Naani. Priya gets angry at Vichu's absence. She finally decides to marry Vichu. Raj kidnaps him on the wedding day, but then Vichu becomes Naani. The kidnappers release him. Naani becomes Vichu and marries Priya that evening. (Hindu marriages usually take place at Night). Vichu knows nothing about marital life.

Naani somehow manages his mother by disappearing at night. Priya needs a child so she intentionally shows her skin to Vichu, who responds. Priya becomes pregnant. Vichu once meets his mother and understands the difficulties of pregnancy for a woman. Naani's child friend demands to play with him, but Naani's schedule is too complicated. Naani slaps his friend and to make him angry and reveals the truth to Priya. Priya is shocked to hear that she is bearing the child of a child.

Priya argues with Vichu for marrying her and making her pregnant, but Vichu blames her arrogance for involving him. Naani turns into Vichu in front of her, shocking Priya. Vichu reveals that he loves her. Priya now goes into labour and Vichu takes her to hospital. On the way Vichu is stopped by Raj's men seeking revenge. Vichu overcomes them. Everybody learns the truth about Naani and Priya.

Twenty years pass. Naani reaches twenty-eight. He lives with Priya as her husband. He goes inside his room as Naani and comes out as a forty-eight-year-old Vichu, father of a twenty-year-old son.

Cast

Production
After the success of Kushi (2001), Surya began pre-production work on a third story titled Naani.

Soundtrack

Reception
Idlebrain.com rated the film 2 out of 5, writing, "the movie suffers from artificialness and [a] bad script." The Tamil version performed well, while the Telugu version was not as strong commercially.

References

External links 
 

2004 multilingual films
2000s science fiction comedy films
2000s Telugu-language films
2004 comedy films
2004 films
Films scored by A. R. Rahman
Indian multilingual films
Indian pregnancy films
Indian remakes of American films
Indian science fiction comedy films
Films directed by S. J. Suryah